Kuney is a surname. Notable people with the surname include:

 Amy Kuney (born 1985), American singer, songwriter, and musician
 Eva Lee Kuney (1934–2015), American actress, dancer, and draftswoman

See also
 Luney